This is a list of the number-one songs of 2021 in Bolivia. The airplay charts are published by Monitor Latino, based on airplay across radio stations in Bolivia utilizing the Radio Tracking Data, LLC in real time. Charts are compiled from Monday to Sunday.

Chart history (Monitor Latino)

General

References

2021 in Bolivia
Bolivia